The Saranac Inn was a large, luxurious hotel located on a peninsula at the northern end of the Upper Saranac Lake in the town of Santa Clara in the Adirondacks in New York State, United States. It was frequented by US Presidents Grover Cleveland and Chester A. Arthur and New York Governor Charles Evans Hughes. It closed in 1962, and burned to the ground in 1978.

Saranac Inn is also the name of a small hamlet that grew up in the vicinity of the Inn, and to the public golf course that was originally part of the Inn. The par 72 Saranac Inn Golf Club was recognized by Golf Digest as one of four U.S. courses that are one hundred years or older that received four and a half stars.

History

Originally built as the Prospect House in 1864, it started as a small hotel that accommodated 15 guests.  It was gradually enlarged to handle up to 100.  In 1886 it was purchased by a group of investors who renamed it Saranac Inn, and began a program of renovation and construction that brought the capacity to 250 by 1909.  The opening of the Mohawk and Malone Railway in 1892, dramatically reducing travel time from major east coast cities to the Adirondacks, had a major impact on the hotel.

In 1912 the hotel was purchased by Harrington Mills, the owner of the Harrington Hotel in Washington, DC, who completely rebuilt the structure, adding  two stories, elevators, and a private bath in each room.  It underwent further enlargement in the 1920s, and noted Saranac Lake architect William G. Distin was responsible for much of the design work.  At its height, between the enlarged main hotel and the many lakeside cottages and platform tents favored by some guests, it could accommodate a thousand guests.

After the Great Depression, the hotel's business dropped sharply, and it changed hands several times.  In 1946, it was purchased by a national hotel chain, who brought in large conventions, briefly improving finances.  It changed hands again in 1957, but closed in 1962 as unprofitable.  Finally, it was bought for $400,000 by auctioneers, who sold the property piecemeal, the golf course, the cottages, the hotel all going to different owners.  In the mid-1970s, the hotel was partially dismembered for salvage materials.  Finally, on June 17, 1978, a spectacular seven-hour fire destroyed what was left.

The small collection of cottages that grew up around the Inn (the first dozen were built by the Inn owners) still exists,[known as the Brown cottages] however, as do some of the Great Camps built in the area.  World War I, the Great Depression and the Income Tax combined to put an end to the Great Camp era, however; and like the Inn, many of the Great Camps were abandoned and/or lost for unpaid taxes, burned or left to crumble.

References

Sources
Tolles, Bryant F., Jr., Resort Hotels of the Adirondacks, University Press of New England, 2003. .

External links
Historic Saranac Lake - Saranac Inn
Bunk's Place - An aerial view of the Inn, unknown date. Another view, showing the golf course.
New York Times, "The Evolution of the Saranac Inn; Steady Growth of the Resort at Which Grover Cleveland Had a Summer Home", July 6, 1902
New York Times, "AT SARANAC INN.; Special to The New York Times", July 10, 1904
New York Times, "SUNSHINE AND PICNICS; A Combination Saranac Sojourners are Playing to the Limit", August 5, 1906
New York Times, "DEVOTEES OF TENT LIFE.; Enjoying the Fresh Air in the Adirondack Mountains", August 12, 1906
Saranac Inn Golf Course

Adirondacks
Buildings and structures in Franklin County, New York
Saranac Lake, New York